Euphorbia obcordata is a species of plant in the family Euphorbiaceae. It is endemic to Yemen.  Its natural habitats are subtropical or tropical dry forests and rocky areas.

References

obcordata
Endemic flora of Socotra
Vulnerable flora of Africa
Vulnerable flora of Asia
Taxonomy articles created by Polbot
Taxa named by Isaac Bayley Balfour